Andrey Vladimirovich Khachaturyan (born on 2 September 1987) is a Belarusian football midfielder of Armenian origin, who is currently playing for Torpedo-BelAZ Zhodino.

International career
He made his first appearance for the senior national side on 15 August 2012 against Armenia in a friendly match.

External links
 
 

1987 births
Living people
Footballers from Minsk
Belarusian people of Armenian descent
Belarusian footballers
Association football midfielders
Belarus international footballers
Belarusian expatriate footballers
Expatriate footballers in Russia
FC Smena Minsk players
FC Minsk players
FC Zhemchuzhina Sochi players
FC Shakhtyor Soligorsk players
FC Neman Grodno players
FC Torpedo-BelAZ Zhodino players
FC Belshina Bobruisk players